Cameroon vs Colombia was a FIFA World Cup match that took place in the Stadio San Paolo in Naples, Italy on 23 June 1990, during the 1990 World Cup. Cameroon won 2–1, thus becoming the first African team  to win a World Cup knockout match.

Overview
For both teams it was the first participation in the knockout stages of the FIFA World Cup: Cameroon got there by winning Group B, Colombia instead obtained the qualification as one of the best third-placed teams. The game was decided in extra time; Milla, who came in the 54th minute, went to score after 106 and 109 minutes. In his second goal, Milla took the ball from the goalkeeper Higuita who was trying to dribble him near the halfway line. Redín pulled one back for Colombia after 115 minutes but it wasn't enough, and Cameroon became the first African nation to reach the quarter-finals of the FIFA World Cup.

The match

References

1990 FIFA World Cup
FIFA World Cup matches
1990
1990
Col
Cam
Football in Naples
20th century in Naples
June 1990 sports events in Europe